Jan Antonín Baťa (March 7, 1898 – August 23, 1965) (also known as Jan Antonin Bata or Jan Bata, called The King of Shoes) was a Czech-Brazilian shoe manufacturer from Uherské Hradiště (southeastern Moravia), half-brother of Tomáš Baťa.

Together with American experts, he participated in the First Prague International Management Congress (PIMCO) in July 1924 in Prague, organized by the Masaryk Academy of Labour.

After the death of his half-brother in 1932, who had founded the firm, Jan Antonin Baťa headed the Baťa company. In 1931 he converted it to a joint stock company, Baťa a.s., still based in Zlín, former Czechoslovakia.

Bata's administration began in May 1931. He implemented new growth plans for the Baťa businesses at the height of the Great Depression. His efforts included expansion into new industries, including: shoe production machinery, tires, textiles, chemicals, mines, canals, a railway, film studios, manufacture of airplanes and bicycles, development of retail department stores, import/export.

At the time when Baťa became owner and chief executive officer, the Baťa organization employed 16,560 co-workers that maintained 1,645 shops and 25 enterprises. Most of it was located in Czech lands (15,770 employees, 1,500 shops, 25 enterprises) and Slovak lands (2 enterprises, 250 employees). The international businesses of the Baťa company consisted of 790 employees, 132 shops, and 20 international enterprises.

During his period, the Czech part of the business more than doubled its size to 38,000 co-workers, 2,200 shops, and 70 enterprises. The Slovak enterprises also expanded exponentially in Slovakia from 250 people to 12,340 and 8 enterprises.

In 1939 when Bohemia and Moravia was annexed by Nazi Germany, Baťa unsuccessfully tried to negotiate with the German authorities in order to prevent the control of his company from being taken over by the German army.  With his family he went into exile to the United States. In 1941 he was blacklisted for having entered into negotiations with the Nazis and was exiled again, settling finally in Brazil. There he founded several company industrial towns, including: Bataiporã, Bataguassu, Batatuba, Anaurilândia and Mariápolis, communities where more than 100,000 people live today.

Up to his death, Baťa expanded the organization more than sixfold from the date of acquisition. From 1931 to 1942, the Baťa organization grew to 105,770 employees.

The Baťavilles were new cities, new industrial communities, each with a specialized purpose, based on the "ideal city" model. In 1935 Jan Baťa proposed a contest for ideal city designs. "In 1935, [Jan] Baťa invited Le Corbusier to Zlín as a member of the jury of Baťa's International Housing Competition and for consultations over the factory city plans." The way Bata introduced the Ideal city concept was based on an architectural design competition.

Factories

Czech Republic
 Zlín
 Otrokovice – Baťov (1930−1934)
 Trebíč (1933)
 Zruč nad Sázavou (1938)
 Sezimovo Ústí (1939)

Slovakia
 Bošany (1931−1934)
 Svit (1938)
 Nové Zámky (1935)
 Liptovský sv. Mikuláš, (1938)
 Baťovany (today Partizánske, 1938)

Europe
 Best, The Netherlands, (1933−1934) 
 East Tilbury, England, (1933−1934) 
 Hellocourt, France, (1933−1935) 
 Vernon, France (1935)
 Neuvic, Dordogne, France (1939)
 Brussels, Belgium (1937)
 Borovo, Croatia (1931−1935)
 Möhlin, Switzerland (1933)
 Chelmek, Poland (1932)
 Martfű, Hungary (1941)

Outside Europe
 Batanagar (India 1934−1935) 
 Belcamp, Maryland USA, (1936−1939)
 Batawa, Canada (1937−1939)
 Batapur, Pakistan

Brazil
 Batatuba (1939)
 Mariapolis, Brazil (1941)
 Bataguassu (1953)
 Município de Batayporã (1963)
 Município de Anaurilândia (1963)

Other Bata factories
Syria (1934)
Iraq, Baghdad (1934)
Klang, Malaya  (1935)
Mansurieh  (suburb of Alexandria), Egypt (1936)
Gwelo formerly Rhodesia, later Gweru, Zimbabwe, (1937)
Indonesia (1938), 
Peru, Lima (1939)
Chile, Batafler (1939)
Java Island, Batavia Kalibata (1939)
Kenya, Nairobi/Limuru (1939)
India, Lahore (1939)
Morocco, Casablanca (1939)
Belgian Congo (1940)
Bolivia, Quillacollo (1940)
Senegal, Dakar French West Africa (1940)
Guatemala (1940)
Haiti, Port-au-Prince (1940)
Vietnam, Haiphong (1940)
Philippines (1940)

References

External links 
 
 
 

Bata family
Jan Antonin
Czechoslovak businesspeople
20th-century Brazilian businesspeople
Czechoslovak emigrants to Brazil
People from Uherské Hradiště
People from Zlín
1898 births
1965 deaths
Recipients of the Order of the White Lion